Paulo Posiano is a Fijian footballer who plays as a defender for Rewa.

References

External links 
 

Living people
1988 births
Fijian footballers
Rewa F.C. players
Fiji international footballers
Association football defenders
I-Taukei Fijian people
2012 OFC Nations Cup players